Lake Pansy, an almost round lake, has a surface area of . This lake is on the north edge of Winter Haven, Florida. The lake's north and west shores are bordered by woods. The east and northwest shores are bordered by residences and the southeast shore borders a citrus grove. Lake Pansy and the Winter Haven Municipal Airport are separated on the west side of the lake by 21st Street Northwest.

Lake Pansy has public access via a public boat ramp on its southeast shore. There are no public swimming areas at this lake. The Hook and Bullet website says this lake contains largemouth bass and perch.

References

Pansy